General Thomas Sarsfield Power (June 18, 1905 – December 6, 1970) was a United States Air Force officer who served as commander in chief of the Strategic Air Command. He was an active military flier for more than 30 years.

Early career
Thomas Sarsfield Power was born in New York City in 1905, a child of Irish immigrants. His parents were Thomas Stack Power, a dried goods salesman, and Mary Amelia Power (née Rice), who had arrived in the United States in 1900. His parents were from wealthy farming stock but the best land and its livestock was destined for others in Tipperary, Ireland. 
 
Power attended Barnard Preparatory School in New York and entered the United States Army Air Corps flying school February 17, 1928. Upon graduation and receiving his rating, he was commissioned a second lieutenant in the Army Air Corps on February 28, 1929.

His early service included assignments at most of the famed Air Corps fields of the day – Chanute Field, Illinois, as a student officer at the Air Corps Technical School's maintenance engineer course; Langley Field, Virginia, as commanding officer of the 2d Wing headquarters detachment (1934); Bolling Field, Washington, D.C., for duty as an Army Air Corps Mail Operation (Eastern Zone) pilot (1934); engineering and armament officer of the 28th Bombardment Squadron at Nichols Field, Philippines; and at Randolph Field, Texas, as a flying instructor (1938–1940). He completed his early career at Maxwell Field, Alabama, as a student at the Air Corps Tactical School (1940–1941).

World War II

After the era of slow promotions during the inter-war years of the 1930s, Power experienced the rapid rise in rank common to many officers of the pre-war Air Corps during World War II, becoming a major in March 1941, a lieutenant colonel in January 1942, and a full colonel in June 1943 eight days after his 38th birthday.

Power initially performed staff duties to September 1943 at Army Air Forces Flying Training Command headquarters in Fort Worth, Texas. Following his promotion to colonel he was assigned as deputy commander of the 58th Bombardment Operational Training Wing (Heavy) at Smoky Hill AAF, Salina, Kansas. After a brief tour as assistant chief of staff for operations of the Second Air Force in Colorado Springs, Colorado, Power gained combat experience flying B-24 missions in Italy while deputy commander of the 304th Bomb Wing between January and July 1944.

After returning to the United States in August 1944, Power was named commander of the 314th Bomb Wing (Very Heavy) and promoted to brigadier general in January 1945. Power moved his B-29s to Guam in December 1944 as part of the 21st Bomber Command. From Guam, he directed the first large-scale fire bomb raid on Tokyo, Japan, on March 9, 1945.  In a command aircraft, flying back and forth over Tokyo during the attack, Power was deeply impressed by the inferno of destruction playing out thousands of feet below.  He later commented, "True there is no room for emotions in war . .  but the destruction I witnessed that night over Tokyo was so overwhelming that it left a tremendous and lasting impression on me."

On August 1, 1945, General Carl Spaatz, then commander of the United States Strategic Air Forces in the Pacific, moved Power up on his staff as deputy chief of staff for operations (A-3). He served in this capacity during the atomic bomb attacks on Hiroshima and Nagasaki.

Cold War and Strategic Air Command

During Operation Crossroads, the 1946 atomic bomb tests at Bikini Atoll, Power was assigned as assistant deputy task force commander for air on Admiral William H. P. Blandy's staff. Then came assignments as deputy assistant chief of air staff for operations in Washington and a period of air attaché duty in London, prior to his transfer to the Strategic Air Command as vice commander in 1948. During the next six years, Power assisted General Curtis E. LeMay, then commander in chief of the Strategic Air Command, in building up SAC. He was then appointed commander of the Air Research and Development Command in 1954, a position he held for three years.

When General LeMay was named vice chief of staff of the Air Force in 1957, Power became commander in chief of SAC and was promoted to four-star rank.

Power was the architect of the Operation Chrome Dome airborne alert program of SAC that ensured that a proportion of the nuclear-armed strategic bombers were always aloft so as to survive a first strike.

When RAND proposed a counterforce strategy, which would require SAC to restrain itself from striking Soviet cities at the beginning of a war, Power countered with:

Professor William Kaufmann from the RAND Corporation, losing his patience, noted: "Well, you'd better make sure that they're a man and a woman." At that point, Power stalked out of the room. The briefing was over. Having been briefed by another famous member of the RAND Corporation, Herman Kahn, on the genetic effects of nuclear weapons, Power replied: "You know, it's not yet been proved to me that two heads aren't better than one."

On October 24, 1962, during the Cuban Missile Crisis, SAC was ordered to "Defcon 2," one step short of nuclear war. Although authorized to increase his alert level, Power took the unprecedented – and unauthorized – action of broadcasting that message to global Strategic Air Command (SAC) nuclear forces "in the clear" (on non-scrambled, open radio channels), presumably in an attempt to scare the Soviets into complying with American demands.

Raymond Garthoff, who was a participant in the crisis, noted that:

Garthoff gives as his source:

The question becomes a bit murkier when new material uncovered by Stanford's Prof. Scott Sagan led him to write:

However, evidence to the contrary (i.e., that Power was trying to do an end run as stated by Garthoff and, earlier, by Sagan) is contained in SAC's history of the Cuban crisis. Pages 94–95 of that document state

Some accounts incorrectly state that General Power went to DEFCON 2 without authorization. As noted by Michael Dobbs in One Minute to Midnight (page 96):

Like his mentor General LeMay, Power believed that the only effective form of war strategy against enemy nations run by dictators in possession of nuclear weapons was Mutually Assured Destruction.  Power continued supervision of this strategy, both in the development and deployment of the necessary weaponry, and the willingness to use these weapons in case of impending threat. Like LeMay, Power emphasized the value of bomber aircraft, which (unlike missiles) can be recalled in the event of an error in technical threat detection, and offer a strategic recourse short of total war.

Power retired from the Air Force on November 30, 1964 and died of a heart attack December 6, 1970. He was a rated command pilot and aircraft observer, and was America's last general officer with no post-secondary education.

Awards and recognition
General Power was awarded the Air Force Distinguished Service Medal, Army Distinguished Service Medal, Silver Star, Legion of Merit with oak leaf cluster, Distinguished Flying Cross, Bronze Star, Air Medal with oak leaf cluster, Air Force Commendation Medal with oak leaf cluster, and the French Croix de Guerre with Palm.
  Air Force Command Pilot Badge
  Missileman Badge
   Air Force Distinguished Service Medal
   Army Distinguished Service Medal
   Silver Star
   Legion of Merit with oak leaf cluster
   Distinguished Flying Cross
   Bronze Star
   Air Medal
   Air Force Commendation Medal with oak leaf cluster
   French Croix de Guerre with Palm.

See also
List of commanders-in-chief of the Strategic Air Command

References

General Thomas S. Power, USAF official biography

External links
 Thomas S. Power Papers at Syracuse University

Recipients of the Air Force Distinguished Service Medal
Recipients of the Silver Star
Recipients of the Legion of Merit
Recipients of the Distinguished Flying Cross (United States)
United States Air Force generals
1905 births
1970 deaths
Military personnel from New York City
Recipients of the Croix de Guerre 1939–1945 (France)
Recipients of the Air Medal
United States Army Air Forces pilots of World War II
United States Army Air Forces generals
United States air attachés
United States Army Air Forces generals of World War II